Brian Kilmeade (born May 7, 1964) is an American television and radio presenter and political commentator for Fox News. On weekdays he co-hosts the morning show, Fox & Friends, and he hosts the Fox News Radio program The Brian Kilmeade Show. On weekends, he hosts One Nation with Brian Kilmeade, which premiered January 29, 2022. He has authored or co-authored non-fiction and fiction books.

Early life and education
Kilmeade was born 1964 in Massapequa, New York. He is the second son of Marie Rose D'Andrea after she married James Kilmeade Jr. in 1960. Brian's father was born in 1931, the son of James Kilmeade Sr., who was born in 1905 in Longford, Ireland, came to New York in 1925, and became a U.S. citizen in 1930. Brian's mother Marie was born in 1934 in Ozone Park and raised in St. Albans, Queens.

After graduating from Massapequa High School in 1982, Kilmeade attended LIU Post in Brookville, New York, where he graduated with a Bachelor of Arts in 1986.

Career 
He began his career as a correspondent on Channel One News, a daily national high school television news program. He later served as an anchor and host for KHSL-TV in Chico, California. He co-hosted The Jim Brown Show on KLSD, an all-sports radio network. In 1993, Kilmeade joined Jim Brown as part of the announcing team for the inaugural Ultimate Fighting Championship event, conducting post-fight interviews. He moved into the play-by-play role for UFC 2 and UFC 3 in 1994.

Kilmeade was a freelance sports anchor for WVIT (NBC) in Hartford, Connecticut, beginning in 1997. He was a sideline reporter for MSG's coverage of Major League Soccer, specifically for the MetroStars.

Later, he worked as a feature reporter and anchor for NewSport where he hosted NewSport Journal, a daily magazine show for the national sports network. He also anchored Scoreboard Central, a live half-hour general sports program. According to his website biography, he has 10 years' experience as a stand-up comedian.

Since 1998 he has co-hosted Fox's cable morning television show, Fox and Friends, along with Steve Doocy and E. D. Hill. In April 2006, he filled in the Fox News Radio time slot of former Fox anchor Tony Snow, who had left the network to become the White House Press Secretary for the George W. Bush Administration.  He is a frequent panelist on The Five airing nightly at 5 p.m. eastern on FNC. He also hosts the Fox News Radio program The Brian Kilmeade Show and hosts "What Made America Great" on Fox Nation. , he also hosts One Nation with Brian Kilmeade, weekends on Fox News.

Views and controversial remarks
Kilmeade faced criticism from the left after expressing support for the right-wing group English Defence League, often described as an extremist group, during an interview with their leader Stephen Yaxley-Lennon, who also uses the name 'Tommy Robinson'. He finished the interview with the words "Tommy, we got your back and we'll definitely look to keep in touch, it's great what you're doing".

"We keep marrying other species and other ethnics"
On July 8, 2009, Kilmeade and two co-hosts were discussing a study that, based on research done in Finland and Sweden, showed people who stay married are less likely to develop Alzheimer's disease. Kilmeade, whose paternal grandfather was Irish, commented, "[In the United States] we keep marrying other species and other ethnics." Ignoring attempts by co-host Gretchen Carlson (who is of Swedish descent) to interrupt him, he added, "See, the problem is the Swedes have pure genes. Because they marry other Swedes... Finns marry other Finns, so they have a pure society. In America we marry everybody, we marry Italians and Irish."

On July 20, 2009, Kilmeade apologized for his remarks, saying, "I made comments that were offensive to many people. That was not my intention, and looking back at those comments I realize they were inappropriate. For that I sincerely apologize. America [is a] huge melting pot, and that is what makes us such a great country."

"All terrorists are Muslims" 
In 2010, Kilmeade said "not all Muslims are terrorists, but all terrorists are Muslims." Kilmeade later said he misspoke, "I don't believe all terrorists are Muslims... What I should have said, and I'd like to clarify, is all terrorists who killed us on 9/11; with the Cole; and the Khobar; and the '98 embassies; that's what I should have said."

"Bowe Bergdahl's father looks like a member of the Taliban" 
On June 3, 2014, Kilmeade made a reference about Bowe Bergdahl's father on air, stating, "I mean, he says he was growing his beard because his son was in captivity. Well, your son's out now. So if you really don't want to no longer look like a member of the Taliban, you don't have to look like a member of the Taliban.  Are you out of razors?"

Photoshopped picture of Judge Bruce Reinhart 
In August 2022, while serving as the fill-in-host of Tucker Carlson Tonight, Kilmeade shared a digitally-altered photo of federal magistrate Judge Bruce Reinhart receiving a foot massage from convicted sex offender Ghislaine Maxwell. Prior to sharing the photoshopped image, Reinhart, who approved the search warrant used by the FBI during their search of Mar-a-Lago, had already been receiving violent and antisemitic death threats.

Donald Trump 
During Trump's presidency, Kilmeade acted as an informal advisor to the administration, flouting journalistic ethical norms.

On June 22, 2018, Kilmeade on Fox & Friends defended the Trump administration family separation policy by saying, "Like it or not, these are not our kids" in reference to children of illegal immigrants who had been separated from their parents and put in detainment.

In 2018, Kilmeade criticized Lesley Stahl of 60 Minutes for asking President Donald Trump about climate change. Kilmeade said that Stahl was pushing an "agenda" and injecting her "point of view" into the interview by asking the President whether he truly believed climate change was a hoax. Kilmeade said, "She really believes in global warming and that's fine, and man's role in climate change and that's okay. But I don't think you should bring your point of view ― she was trying to win over the president with her point of view. There are other scientists. Something is going on out there. The role of man has not been unveiled in a way the president accepts."

Kilmeade has said that Speaker of the House Nancy Pelosi calling President Donald Trump a "racist" is "personally offensive". Previously, when then-Fox News colleague Glenn Beck called President Barack Obama a "racist" while appearing with Kilmeade on Fox & Friends, Kilmeade did not protest Beck's statement.

During the January 6th insurrection, Kilmeade sent messages to White House Chief of Staff Mark Meadows, telling him to get Trump to condemn the on-going insurrection. Kilmeade wrote, "Please, get him on TV." and "Destroying everything you have accomplished."

In January 2022, Kilmeade spoke more critically of Trump, telling Trump that he should "learn to lose" and stating that he had "not seen any" proof that the 2020 election had been stolen from Trump. Kilmeade also encouraged Republicans to "get past questioning election results" and stop calling the media "anti-Trump" for accurately pointing out the false election conspiracies.

Personal life 
He is married to Dawn Kilmeade (née DeGaetano), and they have three children: Bryan, Kirstyn, and Kaitlyn.

Books 

, an historical novel based on facts of the Culper Ring spies who worked for George Washington during the American Revolution
, about President Thomas Jefferson and the First Barbary War
, about President Andrew Jackson and the Battle of New Orleans

References

External links

 
 
 Verified Twitter

1964 births
Living people
American male comedians
American people of Irish descent

American talk radio hosts
American television news anchors
American television sports announcers
Fox News people
Long Island University alumni
Major League Lacrosse announcers
Massapequa High School alumni
Mixed martial arts broadcasters
Television personalities from New York City